Green Hornet and The Green Hornet may refer to:

Alcoholic drink
 Green Hornet, a cocktail made with brandy, lemon juice, and tonic

Automobiles and motorcycles
 Green Hornet, a version of the 1972 AMC Hornet sedan built and marketed in Canada
 The Green Hornet, name under which Amazing Sea-Monkeys inventor Harold von Braunhut raced motorcycles

Comics
 The Green Hornet (comics), a 2010 comic book series by Kevin Smith

Films
 The Green Hornet, the 1940 Universal movie serial based on the radio series
 The Green Hornet Strikes Again!, the 1941 Universal movie serial sequel based on the radio series
 The Green Hornet (1994 film), a Hong Kong film unrelated to the original radio series
 The Green Hornet (2006 film), a French short-movie
 The Green Hornet (2011 film), a film written by Seth Rogen and Evan Goldberg
 The Green Hornet was a nickname for an ice fishing rod used by Walter Matthau's character Max Goldman in the 1993 film Grumpy Old Men

High school athletics
 Green Hornets, the sports teams of Emmaus High School in Pennsylvania

Military
 Green Hornet, nickname for the Bell UH-1F variant of the "Huey" military utility helicopter used in Cambodia and Laos during the Vietnam War
 SIGSALY, an early secure speech system known as "Green Hornet"

Music
"Green Hornet", a jazz version of Rimsky-Korsakov's "Flight of the Bumblebee", recorded by Al Hirt and used as the theme song on The Green Hornet TV series (later used in the 2003 film Kill Bill); the title of the original piece is "Green Bee"

Radio
 The Green Hornet (radio series), the original 1936 radio series that introduced the Green Hornet character
The Green Hornet, a fictional character created by Fran Striker for the 1930s radio program and adapted into several media versions

Slang
Green Hornets, a slang term in some Canadian cities for parking by-law enforcement officers; also "blue hornets" more recently in Toronto since the uniform is now blue (but formerly green)

Street cars and subways
 Green Hornet, PCC streetcars used until 1958 by the Chicago Surface Lines and Chicago Transit Authority
 Green Hornet, an MS Multi-section car (New York City Subway car)

Television
 The Green Hornet, the 1960s television series based on the radio series